David Graf (born 8 September 1989) is a Swiss male BMX rider, representing his nation at international competitions. He won the bronze medal at the 2015 European Games. He competed at world championships, inclusive the 2009, 2011, 2012 and 2015 UCI BMX World Championships, winning the bronze medal in the 2015 men's race.

References

External links
 
 
 
 
 Interview with Graf

1989 births
Living people
BMX riders
Swiss male cyclists
Olympic cyclists of Switzerland
Cyclists at the 2016 Summer Olympics
Cyclists at the 2020 Summer Olympics
European Games medalists in cycling
European Games bronze medalists for Switzerland
Cyclists at the 2015 European Games
People from Winterthur
Sportspeople from the canton of Zürich
Place of birth missing (living people)